Zeus is a fictional deity, appearing in American comic books published by Marvel Comics. The character is based on the god Zeus in Greek mythology.

Russell Crowe portrays the character in the Marvel Cinematic Universe film Thor: Love and Thunder (2022).

Publication history

The comic version of Zeus is based on the god of the same name from Greek mythology. Zeus first appears in Venus #5 (June 1949), and was adapted by Stan Lee and Jack Kirby.

Fictional character biography
Zeus is the youngest son of the Titans Cronus and Rhea, the children of sky god Ouranos and elder goddess Gaea (also known as "Mother Earth"). His father, Cronus, rose to power in the dimension that later became known as Olympus, after fatally wounding his own father, Ouranos. As he lay dying, Ouranos prophesied that one of the children of Cronus would overthrow him, so Cronus ate each of his children as they were born. When Zeus, their sixth child, was born on Mount Lycaeum in Arcadia, Cronus' wife Rhea tricked Cronus into eating a stone instead of the baby. The infant Zeus was secretly entrusted to his grandmother Gaea for safekeeping, and was hidden in the Caves of Dicte on Crete's Aegean Hill. There, Zeus grew to adulthood and plotted his revenge on Cronus. He went down to Tartarus and freed his now adult siblings Hades, Hestia, Hera, Poseidon, and Demeter, as well as the three Cyclopes, and the three Hecatoncheires, hundred-handed giants which Cronus also had imprisoned. The Cyclopes gave the three gods their respective weapons (Zeus' thunderbolt, Poseidon's trident, and Hades' Helm of Darkness) and taught Zeus how to wield his energy-manipulating powers. Zeus led his allies in a ten-year war against Cronus and the Titans. After winning the war, Zeus imprisoned Cronus and most of the male Titans in Tartarus. Zeus drew lots with his brothers Hades and Poseidon, and became supreme ruler of the Olympian gods, their dimension and the sky. He married Hera, but engaged in many relationships with goddesses and mortal women alike, angering his jealous wife. Some of the children from these unions were gods, and joined the Olympian pantheon, while others were mortals such as Helen of Troy and the hero Hercules who eventually became a god.

At some point during Zeus' rise to power, he imprisoned Nyx until the day when the Sun is separated from Earth.

After the Hyborian Age, the ancient Greek civilization began to rise, so Zeus made the Olympian gods known to them to gain their worship. He discovered the principal nexus between the Olympian dimension and Greece was at the top of Mount Olympus, near Olympia, the principal city of Earth's Eternals. Zeus and his daughter Athena met with Zuras, the leader of the Eternals, and his daughter Azura. Given the physical resemblance between the Eternals and Olympians, both parties formed an alliance, with the Eternals representing the gods on Earth. Zuras soon decreed that Azura become Thena. However, the humans began to think of the Eternals as the Olympian gods themselves and not merely their representatives, leading to a growing resentment by the gods towards the Eternals which eventually erupted into war for a time. Christianity eventually became the dominant religion of the Roman Empire, and Zeus decided that the Olympian gods would break most of their ties with Earth, except for Poseidon, who would continue to watch over his worshippers in Atlantis. During the war of Troy, Zeus battled Thor who had accidentally been transported there. Hades deplored Zeus' decree, and challenged Zeus' supremacy many times. A millennium ago, Hercules transported a band of soldiers from ancient Greece through time to battle Norsemen who were under the protection of the Asgardian god Thor, leading to war between the Asgardians and Olympians. Zeus met secretly with the Asgardian ruler Odin, and the two elder gods put an end to the war and formed an alliance to defend Earth from the Celestials.

Zeus' first story in modern comics is about him meeting Thor. He breaks up a fight between Hercules and Thor with his thunderbolt, and makes them clasp hands in friendship. Zeus is later unable to break Hercules' "Olympian contract" with Pluto. Zeus later exiles Hercules from Olympus for a year for going to Earth without permission, despite the fact the Enchantress had taken control of Hercules's mind. Zeus and other Olympian gods are later exiled to another dimension by Typhon. He is rescued by Hercules, revokes the hero's exile and sennd Typhon to Tarterus. Zeus then thwarts Pluto's attempt to conquer Earth. He is later overthrown by an alliance of Ares and the Asgardian Enchantress, and is restored to power by the Avengers. Zeus resists a failed attempt by Ares and Pluto to foment war between Olympus and Asgard. He also thwarts a conspiracy by Pluto, Ares, and Hyppolyta to overthrow him. Zeus later reveals a pact made a millennia ago to end war between Asgard and Olympus. He also reveals an alliance with Odin and the other sky-gods against the Celestials, who had threatened to close off Earth to the Gods. Several Skyfathers create the Destroyer armor, and impart a portion of his power to Thor along with other Godheads to resurrect Odin and the Asgardians when they are slain by the Celestials while in the Destroyer armor. He later attacks the Avengers and attempts to throw them into Tartarus, blaming them for Hercules going into a coma. After attacking Hercules accidentally, he decides the Olympians should not visit Earth.

Olympus was later attacked by the forces of the Japanese god of evil, Amatsu-Mikaboshi. Mikaboshi also stole Alexander, the son of Ares, and brainwashed Alexander into becoming his personal God of War. In the end though, thanks to Ares' love for his son, and the power of Zeus, Alexander broke free and apparently slew Mikaboshi. It came with a heavy price though, as Zeus apparently sacrificed his life to do so, he was stabbed twice by Mikaboshi's dark tendrils, and his body was not found.

During the "Dark Reign" storyline, it was revealed that Pluto has Zeus prisoner and holds a trial against him with Hercules helping his father. The jury consists of Zeus' enemies, with Pluto as a prosecutor. Ultimately, Zeus is convicted, and willingly drinks from the River Lethe, making him lose his memory and renounce his crown to Pluto. After drinking from the waters, he escapes, and is reborn as an adolescent, with Hercules and Athena realizing the reborn Zeus needs to be hidden from Hera. The child Zeus accompanies Hercules on an adventure in Svartalfheim, where he becomes disgusted with his son's apparently oafish ways, and expresses admiration for Thor. Upon meeting Thor, he is convinced that Hercules himself has virtues.

Hera's weapon Continuum is revealed to be a device to recreate the universe in an improved version, destroying the existing one in the process. Hercules, Amadeus Cho, Zeus, and Athena join a group of Avengers in an assault on the Olympus Group Headquarters. He battles Amazon warriors alongside Quicksilver before being captured by Typhon. The knowledge of Zeus' return stuns Hera and he succeeds in convincing her to stop the Continuum machine. Before she is able to do so, Typhon reveals that he is now free from her control. Hera and Zeus try to kill him with their lightning, but it is reflected back and Hera is killed. Typhon reveals he is wearing the Aegis breastplate and slays Zeus as well. The souls of the two gods are seen in the company of Thanatos, reunited and being taken to the underworld.

During the "Chaos War" storyline, Zeus, Hera, and Ares are among the dead characters that Pluto releases in order to help defend the underworld from Amatsu-Mikaboshi. When Amatsu-Mikaboshi arrived, he rips out Zeus' heart again. Zeus, Hera, and Ares then appear amongst Amatsu-Mikaboshi's slave gods, who had enhanced the Olympians' abilities far above their actual prowess. Zeus quickly knocks Galactus to the ground through a massive thunderbolt and physical attacks. After Hercules defeats Mikaboshi he restores Zeus along with the rest of the universe.

Bruce Banner, due to his family being crucial in fighting to save the universe and taking severe damage doing so, appeals to Hercules to help heal A-Bomb and cure Red She-Hulk of her insanity. After Hercules states that only Zeus is able to do so, Hulk starts to wander up Mount Olympus, intending to ask Zeus to pay off his debt, and is attacked by hordes of Greek deities and mythical monsters as Mount Olympus' line of defense. After this fails, Zeus engages Hulk and manages to severely beat him in single combat, whereupon he tortures the already fallen fighter by letting vultures continuously eat him alive (in a similar manner to Prometheus), while gloating that Hulk was "whining" and that his intended self-sacrifice for his friends was the "wrong religion." However, Zeus allows his favorite son Hercules to rescue his captive since he believes that his existence as the Hulk already is a terrible "punishment".

While sleeping with another woman, Zeus was depowered by Hera because of his infidelity and womanizing. He later appears, drunk and overweight, at the bar and restaurant where Hercules works. Meanwhile, Hercules discovers Elektra stealing a museum artifact from the Hand and Zeus tags along. After battling the Hand ninjas, Hercules discovers through Kingpin that Elektra is stealing mystical artifacts for Baba Yaga, a witch who absorbs the magic of the artifacts to regain her youth. Hercules manages to locate Baba Yaga after Elektra steals his weapons. Arriving at Baba Yaga's house, Hercules and Zeus get separated with Zeus being taken prisoner. Hercules then manages to defeat Baba Yaga with Elektra's help. Hercules then lets Zeus absorb the magic from the artifacts, restoring his godly powers. As gratitude, Zeus offers Hercules the chance to regain his godhood but he turns it down and they part ways.

In light of the events of "Avengers: No Surrender," Nyx: Goddess of Night escaped from her imprisonment with her children and started killing the Olympians. Oizys used her powers to place Zeus into a state of despair. Before Nyx killed Zeus, he promised that Hercules and the "Avengers of the Wronged" would avenge him.

Powers and abilities
Zeus belongs to an extra-dimensional race of extraterrestrials known both among themselves and to mortals as the Olympians, also known simply as the Greek gods, Greco-Roman gods, or the Roman gods. Zeus possesses power on a cosmic scale surpassing those of any other Olympians and is the equal of beings such as Galactus, the Celestials, the Stranger and Odin. Like all Olympians, Zeus has superhuman physical attributes of strength, stamina and speed, although he is stronger than the other Olympians with the exception of his demigod son Hercules. His super-speed allows him to run and fly at speeds surpassing the speed of sound and possibly reaching orbital speed, though he is not exclusively a speedster like the mutant Quicksilver or his son the Messenger God Hermes, who is considerably faster than Zeus in the same way Hercules is stronger; his stamina allows him to exert himself rigorously for hours, possibly days, without tiring. His superior Olympian super-strength allows him to stand against virtually any superpowered foe, and the full force of Zeus's magic is powerful enough to stagger Galactus; though he is neither invincible nor omnipotent, and can be defeated by older deities or by cosmic beings of above-godly power. Zeus is virtually immortal in the sense that he does not age, is immune to all known diseases and Earthly toxins, and cannot be killed through conventional means. He, like all Olympians, can regenerate at an accelerated pace and possesses some resistance to magic due to his divine, otherworldly nature and inborn resilience.

Zeus possesses the ability to manipulate vast amounts of cosmic and mystical energy for a variety of purposes, including temporary augmentation of his superhuman physical abilities, firing powerful bolts of electrical force energy, changing his shape and size at will, opening and closing inter-dimensional apertures, sending himself and others through these dimensions, creating mountains, granting superhuman abilities and properties to living beings or inanimate objects, and the power to generate great amounts of electrical energy and discharge it as lightning bolts. Zeus can also control the mystical life energies of other Olympian gods, and has removed and restored much of his son Hercules' divine attributes several times in the past. Zeus possesses limited precognitive abilities that allow him to glimpse various alternate futures. Zeus is also an excellent hand-to-hand combatant, having thousands of years of experience at his disposal, and is virtually invincible in hurling lightning bolts. Zeus wields Olympian weaponry made by Hephaestus from virtually indestructible adamantine, and sometimes rides in a mystical chariot drawn by magical horses capable of flight and traversing the dimensions.

Reception
 In 2019, CBR.com ranked Zeus 2nd in their "Marvel Comics: The 10 Most Powerful Olympians" list.
 In 2021, CBR.com ranked Zeus 2nd in their "Marvel: 10 Most Powerful Olympians" list.
 In 2022, Sportskeeda ranked Zeus 3rd in their "10 best Greek gods from Marvel comics " list.
 In 2022, Screen Rant included Zeus in their "10 Most Powerful Olympian Gods In Marvel Comics" list.

In other media

Television
 Zeus appears in the "Mighty Thor" segment of The Marvel Super Heroes.
 Zeus appears in The Super Hero Squad Show episode "Support Your Local Sky-Father", voiced by Travis Willingham.

Film
Russell Crowe portrays Zeus in the Marvel Cinematic Universe film Thor: Love and Thunder (2022). This version is a hedonistic and self-centered individual who cares more about his orgies and serves as the leader of a corrupt council in Omnipotent City that presides over gods from other pantheons.

References

External links
 Zeus at Marvel.com
 
 

Characters created by Jack Kirby
Characters created by Stan Lee
Classical mythology in Marvel Comics
Comics characters introduced in 1949
Fictional characters involved in incest
Fictional characters with electric or magnetic abilities
Fictional characters with precognition
Fictional characters with superhuman durability or invulnerability
Fictional characters with weather abilities
Fictional gods
Fictional kings
Greek and Roman deities in fiction
Marvel Comics characters who are shapeshifters
Marvel Comics characters who can move at superhuman speeds
Marvel Comics characters who use magic
Marvel Comics characters with accelerated healing
Marvel Comics characters with superhuman strength
Marvel Comics male characters
Zeus